List of federal judges appointed by George Bush may refer to:

List of federal judges appointed by George H. W. Bush, appointments by George H. W. Bush, the 41st president of the United States
List of federal judges appointed by George W. Bush, appointments by George W. Bush, the 43rd president of the United States

See also
George Bush (disambiguation)